The Safad District was a district in the Mandatory Palestine. Its capital was the city of Safad.

Demographics
Based on various censuses conducted by the governing authorities of Palestine, adherents of the different religious communities in the district numbered approximately as follows:

References

District of Safad